Robert Keith Polkinghorne (born 27 February 1958) is a former Australian rules footballer who played with Hawthorn in the Victorian Football League (VFL).

Notes

External links 

Living people
1958 births
People educated at Scotch College, Melbourne
Australian rules footballers from Victoria (Australia)
Hawthorn Football Club players